Mary Sinclair (1922–2000) was an American actress

Mary Sinclair may refer to:

 Mary P. Sinclair (1918–2011), American environmental activist
 Mary Craig Sinclair (1882–1961), writer and the wife of Upton Sinclair
 Mary Emily Sinclair (1878–1955), American mathematician
 May Sinclair, pseudonym of Mary Amelia St. Clair (1863–1946), a popular British writer